Kipushi is a territory in the Haut-Katanga Province of the Democratic Republic of the Congo.

Territories of Haut-Katanga Province